Negreni may refer to several places in Romania:

 Negreni, a commune in Cluj County
Negreni, a village in Dârmănești Commune, Argeș County
Negreni, a village in Poduri Commune, Bacău County
Negreni, a village in Știubieni Commune, Botoșani County
Negreni, a village in Licurici Commune, Gorj County
Negreni, a village in Scornicești town, Olt County
Negreni, a village in Ileanda Commune, Sălaj County
Negreni, a village in Tătărăștii de Jos Commune, Teleorman County
Negreni, a village in Mihăești Commune, Vâlcea County
Negreni (river), a tributary of the Amaradia in Gorj County

and to:
Negrenii-Osebiți, a village in Tătărăștii de Jos Commune, Teleorman County
Negrenii de Câmpie, a village in Band Commune, Mureș County
Negrenii de Sus, a village in Tătărăștii de Jos Commune, Teleorman County

and to:
 Negreni, the Romanian name for Negrintsi village, Dranytsia Commune, Novoselytsia Raion, Ukraine